"Happiness" is a song by the English duo Goldfrapp from their fourth studio album, Seventh Tree (2008). Written and produced by Alison Goldfrapp and Will Gregory, the song was released as the album's second single on 14 April 2008. It was featured in advertisements for the newly rebranded SyFy network.  It reached number 25 on the UK Singles Chart and remains their last top 40 hit. In Scotland, the single peaked at number 6.

Music video
The music video for "Happiness" was directed by Dougal Wilson. The video features a young man (George Foster) dressed in a white suit, jumping joyfully around Addington Square in Camberwell, South London. The video, a homage to the "Street Dance" sequence from the 1953 American musical film Small Town Girl, begins with Alison Goldfrapp sitting on the front steps of a house when suddenly the young man appears jumping up a set of steps next to her. Goldfrapp makes additional cameo appearances in the video as a black-haired bus traveller, a policewoman, a topiarist, and a braided flower stand keeper. Will Gregory makes similar appearances as, among others, a street sweeper and a postman. The video concludes with the cast of background characters coming together along with the young man, who then jumps in a circle with young children and a dancing dog. In the final scene, two elderly people—Goldfrapp and Gregory—arrive to join the revelry.

Track listings

CD single 1 (UK)
"Happiness" (Single Version) – 3:38
"Road to Somewhere" (Acoustic Version) – 3:48

CD single 2 (UK)
"Happiness" (Beyond the Wizards Sleeve Re-Animation) – 7:49
"Monster Love" (Goldfrapp vs. Spiritualized) – 5:36
"Eat Yourself" (Yeasayer Remix) – 2:25

7-inch limited picture disc (UK)
"Happiness" (Single Version) – 3:38
"Happiness" (Metronomy Remix feat. The Teenagers) – 4:10

Digital single
"Happiness" (Single Version) – 3:37
"Happiness" (Metronomy Remix feat. The Teenagers) – 4:10
"Road to Somewhere" (Acoustic Version) – 3:50
"Happiness" (Beyond the Wizards Sleeve Re-Animation) – 7:48
"Monster Love" (Goldfrapp vs. Spiritualized) – 5:37
"Eat Yourself" (Yeasayer Remix) – 2:26
"Happiness" (Live at the Union Chapel) – 4:42

Personnel
The following people contributed to "Happiness":

Musicians
Alison Goldfrapp – vocals
Flood – keyboards
Charlie Jones – bass
Metro Voices – choir
Jenny O'Grady – choir master
Damon Reece – drums, percussion

Production
Alison Goldfrapp – producer, engineer, art direction
Will Gregory – producer, engineer
Cathy Edwards – art direction
Flood – co-producer
Tony Hoffer – mixing
Serge Leblon – photography
Mat Maitland – art direction, design
Stephen Marcussen – mastering
Bill Mims – assistant mixing
Tim Oliver – engineering

Charts

References

2008 singles
2008 songs
Goldfrapp songs
Mute Records singles
Song recordings produced by Flood (producer)
Songs written by Alison Goldfrapp
Songs written by Will Gregory